The MU puzzle is a puzzle stated by Douglas Hofstadter and found in Gödel, Escher, Bach involving a simple formal system called "MIU". Hofstadter's motivation is to contrast reasoning within a formal system (ie., deriving theorems) against reasoning about the formal system itself. MIU is an example of a Post canonical system and can be reformulated as a string rewriting system.

The puzzle
The MU puzzle asks one to start with the "axiomatic" string  and transform it into the string  using in each step one of the following transformation rules:
{|
|-
| Nr.          
| COLSPAN=3 | Formal rule
| Informal explanation
| COLSPAN=3 | Example
|-
| 1.
| ALIGN=RIGHT | x || → || x 
| ALIGN=RIGHT |  || to || 
|-
| 2.
| ALIGN=RIGHT | x || → || xx
| Double the string after the 
| ALIGN=RIGHT |  || to || 
|-
| 3.
| ALIGN=RIGHT | xy || → || xy
| Replace any  with a 
| ALIGN=RIGHT |  || to || 
|-
| 4.
| ALIGN=RIGHT | xy || → || xy
| Remove any 
| ALIGN=RIGHT |  || to || 
|}

Solution
The puzzle cannot be solved: it is impossible to change the string  into  by repeatedly applying the given rules. In other words, MU is not a theorem of the MIU formal system. To prove this, one must step "outside" the formal system itself.

In order to prove assertions like this, it is often beneficial to look for an invariant; that is, some quantity or property that doesn't change while applying the rules.

Only the second and third rules change this number. In particular, rule two will double it while rule three will reduce it by 3.
 In the beginning, the number of s is 1 which is not divisible by 3.
 Doubling a number that is not divisible by 3 does not make it divisible by 3.
 Subtracting 3 from a number that is not divisible by 3 does not make it divisible by 3 either.

In the language of modular arithmetic, the number n of  obeys the congruence

where a counts how often the second rule is applied.

A decidable criterion for derivability

Proof
Therefore, every x derived from  respects properties 1 and 2. As shown before, it also respects property 3.

By property 3, the number  cannot be divisible by 3, hence,  cannot be, either. That is, . The  count can always be made even, by applying the first rule once, if necessary.

Example
                      .

Arithmetization

Chapter XIX of Gödel, Escher, Bach gives a mapping of the MIU system to arithmetic, as follows. (For example, the string  would be mapped to 31010.)

Second, the single axiom of the MIU system, namely the string , becomes the number 31.

Third, the four formal rules given above become the following:

{|
|-
| Nr.          
| COLSPAN=3 ALIGN=CENTER | Formal rule
| COLSPAN=4 ALIGN=CENTER | Example
|  
|-
| 1.
| ALIGN=RIGHT | k × 10 + 1 ||  →  || 10 × (k × 10 + 1)          
| ALIGN=RIGHT | 31 ||  →  || 310
| ALIGN=LEFT |  (k = 3)
|-
| 2.
| ALIGN=RIGHT | 3 × 10m + n ||  →  || 10m × (3 × 10m + n) + n
| ALIGN=RIGHT | 310 ||  →  || 31010
| ALIGN=LEFT |  (m = 2, n = 10)
|-
| 3.
| ALIGN=RIGHT | k × 10m+3 + 111 × 10m + n ||  →  || k × 10m + 1 + n
| ALIGN=RIGHT | 3111011 ||  →  || 30011
| ALIGN=LEFT |  (k = 3, m = 3, n = 11)
|-
| 4.
| ALIGN=RIGHT | k × 10m+2 + n ||  →  || k × 10m + n
| ALIGN=RIGHT | 30011 ||  →  || 311
| ALIGN=LEFT |  (k = 3, m = 2, n = 11)
|}

(NB: The rendering of the first rule above differs superficially from that in the book, where it is written as "[i]f we have made 10m + 1, then we can make 10 × (10m + 1)". Here, however, the variable m was reserved for use in exponents of 10 only, and therefore it was replaced by k in the first rule. Also, in this rendering, the arrangement of factors in this rule was made consistent with that of the other three rules.)

Relationship to logic

The MIU system illustrates several important concepts in logic by means of analogy.

It can be interpreted as an analogy for a formal system — an encapsulation of mathematical and logical concepts using symbols. The MI string is akin to a single axiom, and the four transformation rules are akin to rules of inference.

The MU string and the impossibility of its derivation is then analogous to a statement of mathematical logic which cannot be proven or disproven by the formal system.

It also demonstrates the contrast between interpretation on the "syntactic" level of symbols and on the "semantic" level of meanings. On the syntactic level, there is no knowledge of the MU puzzle's insolubility. The system does not refer to anything: it is simply a game involving meaningless strings. Working within the system, an algorithm could successively generate every valid string of symbols in an attempt to generate MU, and though it would never succeed, it would search forever, never deducing that the quest was futile. For a human player however, after a number of attempts, one soon begins to suspect that the puzzle may be impossible. One then "jumps out of the system" and starts to reason about the system, rather than working within it. Eventually, one realises that the system is in some way about divisibility by three. This is the "semantic" level of the system — a level of meaning that the system naturally attains. On this level, the MU puzzle can be seen to be impossible.

The inability of the MIU system to express or deduce facts about itself, such as the inability to derive MU, is a consequence of its simplicity. However, more complex formal systems, such as systems of mathematical logic, may possess this ability. This is the key idea behind Godel's Incompleteness Theorem.

Pedagogical uses

In her textbook, Discrete Mathematics with Applications, Susanna S. Epp uses the MU puzzle to introduce the concept of recursive definitions, and begins the relevant chapter with a quote from GEB.

See also
Invariant (mathematics)
Unrestricted grammar

Notes

References

External links

  An online interface for producing derivations in the MIU System.
  An online JavaScript implementation of the MIU production system.

Logic puzzles
Unsolvable puzzles
Independence results
Formal languages
1979 introductions